Dwadashbari is a village in the Bishnupur CD block in the Bishnupur subdivision of the Bankura district in the state of West Bengal, India.

Geography

Location

Note: The map alongside presents some of the notable locations in the subdivision. All places marked in the map are linked in the larger full screen map.

Demographics
According to the 2011 Census of India, Dwadashbari had a total population of 604, of which 325 (54%) were males and 279 (46%) were females. There were 69 persons in the age range of 0–6 years. The total number of literate persons in Dwadasbari was 360 (67.29% of the population over 6 years).

Transport
Bishnupur railway station on the Kharagpur-Bankura-Adra line is located nearby.

Culture
David J. McCutchion says that the most impressive ek-ratna (single tower) temples were built by the Malla kings. He lists several temples with structural variations: Kala-Chand, Lalji, Jora Mandir, Radha-Govinda, Radha-Madhava, Madan-Mohana, Radha-Syama (all at Bishnupur) and several outside Bishnupur. He points out the experimental variations of the Jadava Raya temple at Jadabnagar, with a “disproportionately massive upper structure” and the Nandakisor temple at Dwadashbari with a “tower on eight slender pillars.” He mentions the Dwadashbari temple as a plain, laterite, abandoned structure.

References

External links

Villages in Bankura district